Massimo Oberti (22 June 1901 – 6 January 1972) was an Italian sailor. He competed at the mixed 6 metres at the 1928 and 1936 Summer Olympics, as well as the mixed 5.5. metres at the 1956 Summer Olympics.

References

External links
 

1901 births
1972 deaths
Sportspeople from Genoa
Italian male sailors (sport)
Sailors at the 1928 Summer Olympics – 6 Metre
Sailors at the 1936 Summer Olympics – 6 Metre
Sailors at the 1956 Summer Olympics – 5.5 Metre
Olympic sailors of Italy